Pietro Camporesi (born October 25, 1987 in Bologna) is an Italian slalom canoer. At the 2012 Summer Olympics he competed in the C-2 event together with Niccolò Ferrari. They did not advance to the semifinals after finishing 13th in the qualifying round.

2002

2003

2004

2005

2007 and later 
Camporesi began to compete with Niccolò Ferrari in C2 canoeing.

References

Sports-Reference.com profile

Italian male canoeists
1987 births
Living people
Olympic canoeists of Italy
Canoeists at the 2012 Summer Olympics
Sportspeople from Bologna
21st-century Italian people